Love Is a Beautiful Thing  may refer to:
"Love Is a Beautiful Thing" (Phil Vassar song), originally released by Paul Brandt under the title "It's a Beautiful Thing"
"Love Is a Beautiful Thing" (Al Green song)
"Love Is a Beautiful Thing", a song by Christian hip hop band Group 1 Crew
"Love Is a Beautiful Thing", a song by The Rascals, from the B-side of "You Better Run"

See also
It's a Beautiful Thing (disambiguation)